This is a listing of the national Swimming records for Lithuania. They are the fastest time ever-swum by a Lithuanian swimming in either a long course (50m) or short course (25m) pool. These records are maintained by Lithuania's national swimming federation: Lietuvos plaukimo federacija (LPF).

Records are keep for the following events, for both long course and short course pool and for males and females:
freestyle: 50, 100, 200, 400, 800 and 1500;
backstroke: 50, 100 and 200;
breaststroke: 50, 100 and 200;
butterfly: 50, 100 and 200;
individual medley (or I.M.): 100 (25m only), 200, and 400; and
relays: 4x50 free (25m only), 4x100 free, 4x200 free, 4x50 medley (25m only), and 4 × 100 medley.

Long course (50m)

Men

|-bgcolor=#DDDDDD
|colspan=9|
|-

|-bgcolor=#DDDDDD
|colspan=9|
|-

|-bgcolor=#DDDDDD
|colspan=9|
|-

|-bgcolor=#DDDDDD
|colspan=9|
|-

|-bgcolor=#DDDDDD
|colspan=9|
|-

Women

|-bgcolor=#DDDDDD
|colspan=9|
|-

|-bgcolor=#DDDDDD
|colspan=9|
|-

|-bgcolor=#DDDDDD
|colspan=9|
|-

|-bgcolor=#DDDDDD
|colspan=9|
|-

|-bgcolor=#DDDDDD
|colspan=9|
|-

Mixed relay

Short Course (25m)

Men

|-bgcolor=#DDDDDD
|colspan=9|
|-

|-bgcolor=#DDDDDD
|colspan=9|
|-

|-bgcolor=#DDDDDD
|colspan=9|
|-

|-bgcolor=#DDDDDD
|colspan=9|
|-

|-bgcolor=#DDDDDD
|colspan=9|
|-

Women

|-bgcolor=#DDDDDD
|colspan=9|
|-

|-bgcolor=#DDDDDD
|colspan=9|
|-

|-bgcolor=#DDDDDD
|colspan=9|
|-

|-bgcolor=#DDDDDD
|colspan=9|
|-

|-bgcolor=#DDDDDD
|colspan=9|
|-

Mixed relay

Notes

See also
List of Baltic records in swimming
List of Lithuanian records

References
General
Lithuanian Records 4 March 2023 updated
Specific

External links

Lithuanian records swimrankings.net 4 March 2023 updated

Lithuania
Records
Swimming records
Swimming